Elizabeth Mary Hollingsworth (born November 1950) is a British historian who specialises in the history of medieval Italy.

Selected publications
 Princes of the Renaissance  (2021)
 The Family Medici: The Hidden History of the Medici Dynasty (2018)
 The Medici (2017)
 Conclave: 1559 (2013)
 The Borgias: History's Most Notorious Dynasty (2011)
 Art in World History (2008)
 The Cardinal’s Hat: Money, Ambition and Housekeeping in a Renaissance Court (2004)
 Patronage in Sixteenth Century Italy (1996)
 Patronage in Renaissance Italy: From 1400 to the Early Sixteenth Century (1994)
 Architecture of the 20th Century (1988)

References

External links
Official website

Living people
Women art historians
Independent scholars
Historians of Italy
1950 births
Alumni of the University of Manchester
British art historians
Alumni of the University of East Anglia
British women historians